Leucopogon lasiostachyus is a species of flowering plant in the heath family Ericaceae and is endemic to the south-west of Western Australia. It is an erect shrub with egg-shaped to lance-shaped leaves and dense, cylindrical spikes of tube-shaped white flowers on the ends of branches and in leaf axils.

Description

Taxonomy
Leucopogon lasiostachyus was first formally described in 1859 by Sergei Sergeyevich Sheglejev in the Bulletin de la Société impériale des naturalistes de Moscou from specimens collected by James Drummond. The specific epithet (lasiostachyus) means "shaggy- or woolly-hairy flower spike".

Distribution and habitat
This leucopogon grows in rocky soils on sandplains, ridge tops and hills in the Esperance Plains and Jarrah Forest bioregions of south-western Western Australia.

Conservation status
Leucopogon lasiostachyus is listed as "not threatened" by the Government of Western Australia Department of Biodiversity, Conservation and Attractions.

References

lasiostachyus
Ericales of Australia
Flora of Western Australia
Plants described in 1859